Arend Johan van Glinstra (1754 – 31 May 1814) was a Dutch painter.

Arend Johan van Glinstra was born in Cornjum in Leeuwarderadeel. He was initially taught by Jurriaan Andriessen. He worked primarily making copies of other artists' works. Many of his paintings depicted landscapes with soldiers, horsemen or hunters. He died in Leeuwarden on 31 May 1814.

References

1754 births
1814 deaths
18th-century Dutch painters
18th-century Dutch male artists
19th-century Dutch painters
Dutch male painters
People from Leeuwarderadeel
19th-century Dutch male artists